Statistics of Úrvalsdeild in the 1950 season.

Overview
It was contested by 5 teams, and KR won the championship. Fram's Ríkharður Jónsson and Lárus Hallbjörnsson, as well as ÍA's Þórður Þórðarson, Valur's Halldór Halldórsson and Víkingur's Gunnlaugur Lárusson, were the joint top scorers with 3 goals.

Teams

League standings

Results

Úrvalsdeild karla (football) seasons
Iceland
Iceland
Urvalsdeild